In linear algebra, the operator monotone function is an important type of real-valued function, first described by Charles Löwner in 1934. It is closely allied to the operator concave and operator concave functions, and is encountered in operator theory and in matrix theory, and led to the Löwner–Heinz inequality.

Definition

Notation

This definition is frequently expressed with the notation that is now defined. 
Write  to indicate that a matrix  is positive semi-definite and write  to indicate that the difference  of two matrices  and  satisfies  (that is,  is positive semi-definite). 

 

The definition of an operator monotone function may now be restated as:

See also

References

Further reading

 
 
 

Matrix theory
Operator theory